These lists give the states of primary affiliation and of birth for each president of the United States.

Birthplaces 
Twenty-one states have the distinction of being the birthplace of a president. One president's birth state is in dispute; North and South Carolina (British colonies at the time) both lay claim to Andrew Jackson, who was born in 1767, in the Waxhaw region along their common border. Jackson himself considered South Carolina as his birth state. Born on December 5, 1782, Martin Van Buren was the first president born an American citizen (and not a British subject).

The term Virginia dynasty is sometimes used to describe the fact that four of the first five U.S. presidents were from Virginia. The number of presidents per state in which they were born, counting Jackson as being from South Carolina, are:
 One: Arkansas, California, Connecticut, Georgia, Hawaii, Illinois, Iowa, Kentucky,  Missouri, Nebraska, New Hampshire, New Jersey, and South Carolina
 Two: North Carolina, Pennsylvania, Texas, and Vermont
 Four: Massachusetts
 Five: New York
 Seven: Ohio
 Eight: Virginia

Presidential birthplace and early childhood historic sites 
The birthplaces and early childhood residences of many U.S. presidents have been preserved or replicated. In instances where a physical structure is absent, a monument or roadside marker has been erected to denote the site's historic significance. All sites in the table below are listed in the National Register of Historic Places.

A dramatic shift in childbirth from home to hospital occurred in the United States in the early 20th century (mid–1920s to 1940). Reflective of this trend, Jimmy Carter and all presidents born during and after World War II (Bill Clinton and every president since) have been born in a hospital, not a private residence. This sortable table is ordered by the presidents' birthdates.

States of primary affiliation 

A list of U.S. presidents including the state with which each was primarily affiliated or most closely associated with, due to residence, professional career, and electoral history.

Notes

Presidents by state of primary affiliation
A list of U.S. presidents grouped by primary state of residence and birth, with priority given to residence. Only 19 out of the 50 states are represented. Presidents with an asterisk (*) did not primarily reside in their respective birth states (they were not born in the state listed below).

References

External links 
 American Presidents Sites - Discover Our Shared Heritage Travel Itinerary from the National Park Service

United States, Vice Presidents
Home state